Ayberk Sevinç (born July 19, 1988 in Zonguldak) is a Turkish volleyball player. Sevinç is 191 cm and plays as libero. He has played for Fenerbahçe Men's Volleyball Team since 2004 and wears number 4. He played 48 times for the Turkish national team. He also played for Erdemir.

External links
 Player profile at fenerbahce.org

1988 births
Living people
Sportspeople from Zonguldak
Turkish men's volleyball players
Fenerbahçe volleyballers
21st-century Turkish people